Glycymeris spectralis is a bivalve species in the family Glycymerididae.

References

spectralis